I'll Get This is a British television comedy game show produced by 12 Yard Productions for the BBC. The first episode was broadcast on BBC Two on 6 November 2018. The format sees five celebrities going out for dinner together with each placing their bank card in the middle of the table. They play a series of games, the winner of each game gets to take their card back, the celebrity whose card remains at the end pays the bill for the whole table.

The show was originally shown in 30 minute shows, with 45 minute extended shows entitled I'll Get This Extra Helping shown at a later date, but with Series 2, all of the episodes shown were the extended Extra Helping episodes.

Transmissions

Series

Specials

Series overview
The order shows when each celebrity got to retrieve their card, with the celebrity in Bold paying the bill.

Series 1 (2018)

Specials (2019)

Series 2 (2020)

References

External links
 
 
 
 

2018 British television series debuts
2020 British television series endings
2010s British game shows
2020s British game shows
BBC television game shows
Television series by ITV Studios
English-language television shows